Sophia Mattayo Simba (born 27 July 1950) is a Tanzanian CCM politician and a special seat Member of Parliament since 2010. She was the Minister of Community Development, Gender and Children.

References

1950 births
Living people
Chama Cha Mapinduzi MPs
Tanzanian MPs 2010–2015
Government ministers of Tanzania
Forest Hill Secondary School alumni
University of Dar es Salaam alumni
University of Zimbabwe alumni
University of New Hampshire alumni